Oliver Alexander Reinhard Petszokat (born 10 August 1978), better known by his stage name Oli.P, is a German singer, actor and television presenter.

Biography 
Petszokat, whose father Reinhard Petszokat was a policeman, began ballroom dancing at the age of ten. His biggest dance success was in 1995 as a participant in the winning team for the Youth Cup team of the Dance Sport Federation of North Rhine-Westphalia eV.

In Germany, Petszokat became famous as pop singer Oli.P. On German broadcaster RTL, he played character Ricky Marquart in the television series Gute Zeiten, schlechte Zeiten. In several television shows he worked as television presenter (Big Brother, ...). 

In 1999, Petszokat married German actress Tatiani Katrantzi. Together they have one child. In 2007, the couple separated.

Awards 
 1998: Bravo Otto
 1999: Bravo Otto
 2000: Echo

Discography

(as Oli.P)

Albums
Studio albums
 1998: Mein Tag
 1999: o.ton
 2001: P.ulsschlag
 2002: Startzeit
 2004: Freier Fall
 2016: Wie früher
 2019: Alles Gute!

Compilation albums
 2002: Lebenslauf – Gold & Platin 98-01

Singles
 1997: "Liebe machen"
 1998: "Flugzeuge im Bauch"
 1998: "I Wish"
 1999: "Der 7. Sinn"
 1999: "So bist du (und wenn du gehst...)"
 2000: "Niemals mehr"
 2000: "Plötzlich stand sie da"
 2001: "Girl You Know It's True"
 2001: "When You Are Here"
 2002: "Das erste Mal tat's noch weh"
 2002: "Nothing's Gonna Change My Love for You"
 2003: "Alles ändert sich (alles oder nichts)"
 2003: "Neugeboren"
 2004: "Engel" / "Unsterblich"
 2016: "Wie früher"
 2016: "Wohin gehst du"
 2019: "Flugzeuge im Bauch (2K19)"
 2019: "Lieb mich ein letztes Mal"
 2019: "Hallo Schatz"

Filmography

TV series 
 1996–1997: Alle zusammen – jeder für sich (230 episodes)
 1998–1999: Gute Zeiten, schlechte Zeiten (480 episodes)
 1999: Hinter Gittern – Der Frauenknast (4 episodes)
 2002: Der kleine Mönch (7 episodes)
 2004: Wie erziehe ich meine Eltern? (1 episode)
 2004: Im Namen des Gesetzes (1 episode)
 2005: Axel! will's wissen (1 episode)
 2006–2007: Gott sei dank … dass Sie da sind! (6 episodes)
 2010–2011: Hand aufs Herz (234 episodes)
 2015: Die tierischen 10 (VOX)
 2016: Rote Rosen (ARD)

Films
 2000: Wie angelt man sich seinen Chef?
 2001: Girl
 2003: Baltic Storm
 2003: Motown
 2005: Ein Hund, zwei Koffer und die ganz große Liebe
 2007: Die ProSieben Märchenstunde: Dörnröschen – ab durch die Hecke
 2008: Funny Movie – Dörtes Dancing

References

External links 

German television presenters
1978 births
Living people
German male film actors
German male television actors
21st-century German  male  singers
RTL Group people
Mass media people from Berlin